Tough is a studio album by John Mayall.
Released in 2009, the album features Jay Davenport on drums, Greg Rzab on bass, Tom Canning on keyboards and Rocky Athas on lead guitar. Mayall sings and plays harmonica, organ and guitar.

Track listing
All tracks composed by John Mayall; except where indicated
 "Nothing to Do with Love" (Jerry Lynn Williams, John F. Miller) – 5:54
 "Just What You're Looking For" (Peter Harper) – 4:23
 "Playing with a Losing Hand" (Walter Trout) – 4:09
 "An Eye for An Eye" (Jeffrey Pitchell) – 4:34
 "How Far Down" (Gary Nicolson, Kenneth Greenberg) – 5:04
 "Train to My Heart" (David Fields) – 4:34
 "Slow Train to Nowhere" – 4:28
 "Numbers Down" (Andrew Winton) – 3:59
 "That Good Old Rockin' Blues" – 4:55
 "Tough Times Ahead" – 7:18
 "The Sum of Something" (Curtis Salgado) – 5:31

Personnel
 Rocky Athas – guitar
 Tom Canning – organ, piano, background vocals
 John Mayall – guitar, 12 String guitar, harmonica, organ, piano, vocals
 Maggie Mayall – background vocals
 Greg Rzab  – bass guitar

Other credits
 Michael Aarvold – engineer, mastering, producer
 Fabrice Demessence – photography
 Stuart Green – design
 Maggie Mayall – photography, producer, track notes
 Jeremy Olsen – photography

References

2009 albums
John Mayall albums
Albums produced by John Mayall
Eagle Records albums